American Football (sometimes stylised in all lowercase as american football or americ anfootball) is an American rock band from Urbana, Illinois, originally active from 1997 until 2000, and again beginning with 2014 and onwards. The band was formed by guitarist/bassist and singer Mike Kinsella (formerly of Cap'n Jazz and Joan of Arc and currently of Owen), guitarist Steve Holmes (also a member of the Geese) and drummer and trumpet player Steve Lamos (formerly of the One Up Downstairs, one-time member of the Firebird Band and Edward Burch & the Staunch Characters, and currently of the Geese and DMS), who left the band in 2021, but later rejoined in 2023.

Despite the group's short initial lifespan, their self-titled debut album became one of the most acclaimed emo and math rock records of its era. American Football reunited in 2014, with Kinsella's cousin Nate Kinsella joining the band, and has since released two more albums, both bearing the same name as their debut: American Football (2016) and American Football (2019).

History
Mike Kinsella and Steve Holmes knew one another at an early age, as both were students at Wheeling High School in Wheeling, Illinois, where Kinsella played drums for Cap'n Jazz; Holmes played guitar in a variety of bands. Kinsella and Lamos began playing together with David Johnson and Allen Johnson in 1997 under the name the One Up Downstairs, in which Kinsella was exclusively a vocalist. Three songs were recorded under this name, with the intention of releasing them as a 7" record on Polyvinyl Records. However, the band splintered before the record could be pressed, and the songs were shelved. The three tracks recorded by the One Up Downstairs would finally be released in 2006 as a digital download EP and in 2009 as a 7" record through Polyvinyl.

David Johnson and Allen Johnson went on to form the band Very Secretary (and later Favorite Saints), while Kinsella and Lamos began working with Steve Holmes. American Football completed a total of two releases—a titular EP in 1998 and its debut album in 1999, both through Polyvinyl Records. Though the band did not record bass on the EP, Kinsella played bass guitar on some songs for the LP.

Within a year of the release of its full-length, American Football became a studio project. Shortly thereafter, the band mutually decided to stop recording together. Still, American Football gained critical acclaim for that album, which merged the plain-spoken, confessional lyrics and the varying time signatures of math rock with a softer musical sensibility. These characteristics carried on in Mike Kinsella's solo project Owen, and Kinsella would later re-record "Never Meant" as Owen in 2004.

Reformation 
In March 2014, Polyvinyl Records announced a deluxe re-issue of the band's eponymous debut album, including 10 additional unheard demos and live recordings. Live dates, in Champaign and New York, were announced the following month, all of which sold out. For these dates, Mike's cousin Nate Kinsella joined the band on bass – becoming a permanent fixture of the band thereafter. Further tour dates followed in the US, Canada, Spain, UK, Japan, and Australia.

Two years after reforming, the band released their second album. Again eponymous, and again on Polyvinyl, the album was released in October 2016, preceded by single "I've Been So Lost For So Long", which was made available for streaming through SoundCloud. The album's cover featured the same house photographed on the band's first full-length. The "American Football House" became a landmark for emo music fans around the world, who would travel to Urbana, Illinois to take photos outside of the home.

American Football's third album, once again eponymous, was released in March 2019, with the single "Silhouettes" made available upon announcement the preceding December. A second single, "Uncomfortably Numb", followed in January 2019. It featured vocals from Paramore's Hayley Williams, marking the first time the band had implemented a featured artist on a song.

Steve Lamos announced his departure the band in July 2021, citing a change of situation in his life. A single with the tracks "Rare Symmetry" and "Fade Into You" (a Mazzy Star cover), was released in December the same year.

On February 13, 2023, the band were announced as the opener for The 1975's outdoor show at Finsbury Park in London. The show, set to take place on July 2, will mark the band's first public live show since December 2019. Later that day, Lamos confirmed his return to the band via Instagram.

Musical style
Although they are usually described as an emo band, as one of the most important bands of the late 1990s Midwestern emo scene and subgenre, American Football's musical style has been also described as math rock, and post-rock due to them having uncommon time signatures in their songs, which is a staple in both the math rock and post-rock's sounds. While their various works have been punctually described as indie rock, dream pop, and slowcore.

Talking about the group's sound, Tim Sendra of AllMusic stated, "The trio spent almost a year coming up with a clean, melodic approach that blended the intimacy of emo with the empty space of jazz, while adding pop hooks and jangling guitar interplay to the mix."
In their article about the math rock's history, specialized online magazine Fecking Bahamas described American Football as "a second-wave emo band rooted in unconventional melodic song structures as well as containing elements of math rock and slowcore."

Members
Current members
Mike Kinsella – lead vocals, guitar (1997–2000, 2014–present), bass guitar (1997–2000)
Steve Holmes – guitar (1997–2000, 2014–present), keyboards (1997–2000)
Nate Kinsella  – bass guitar, backing vocals, vibraphone (2014–present) 
Steve Lamos – drums, percussion, trumpet (1997–2000, 2014–2021, 2023–present)

Former touring musicians
Mike Garzon – percussion, melodica (2016–2019)
Cory Bracken – vibraphone (2019)
Sarah Versprille – backing vocals (2019)

Timeline

Discography

 American Football (1999)
 American Football (2016)
 American Football (2019)

References

External links
 American Football at Polyvinyl Records
 American Football at joanfrc.com
 American Football at Epitonic

Polyvinyl Record Co. artists
Musical groups established in 1997
Musical groups disestablished in 2000
Emo musical groups from Illinois
Indie rock musical groups from Illinois
Musical groups reestablished in 2014
Wichita Recordings artists
1997 establishments in Illinois
2000 disestablishments in Illinois
Family musical groups
Big Scary Monsters Recording Company artists